Lima Mountain is a 2238-foot summit in Cook County, Minnesota. It is located in the Lima Mountain Unit, a 2540-acre inventoried roadless area adjacent to the Boundary Waters Canoe Area. There is a 1-mile trail to the summit, where a fire tower once stood. Lima Mountain has a 328-foot rise over the saddle connecting it with the Misquah Hills High Point and Peak 2266. A trail to the summit begins along the Lima Grade (Forest Route 315) just north of its junction with Lima Mountain Road (Forest Route 152)

References

Mountains of Cook County, Minnesota
Mountains of Minnesota